No. 671 Squadron RAF was a glider squadron of the Royal Air Force active during the Second World War.

History
671 Squadron was formed at Bikram, Patna in India as a glider squadron on 1 January 1945 by renumbering No. 669 Squadron RAF, with the intention of being used for airborne operations by South East Asia Command. It continued to train, as part of No. 344 Wing RAF, until the surrender of Japan, when it became surplus to requirements. The squadron was disbanded at Kargi Road on 25 October 1945.

Present
The original squadron is represented today by 671 Squadron of 7 Regiment, Army Air Corps.

Aircraft operated

Squadron bases

References

Notes

Bibliography

External links
 Squadron history for nos. 671-1435 sqn. at RAF Web

Aircraft squadrons of the Royal Air Force in World War II
671 Squadron